Culex (Lutzia) fuscanus is a species of mosquito belonging to the genus Culex. It is found in China, India, Indonesia and Sri Lanka They are natural predators of disease causing mosquito larva such as Aedes aegypti, Anopheles subpictus, and ''Culex tritaeniorhynchus.

References

External links 
Prey and Feeding Behavior of Larval Culex (Lutzia) fuscanus (Diptera: Culicidae) in Shantou, Guangdong Province, China
Anopheles indefinitus and Culex fuscanus (Diptera: Culicidae) in Saipan.
Culex fuscanus (mosquito)
A microsporidium of the predacious mosquito Culex fuscanus

fuscanus